The following are the Pulitzer Prizes for 1956.

Journalism awards

Public Service:
 Watsonville Register-Pajaronian for courageous exposure of corruption in public office, which led to the resignation of a district attorney and the conviction of one of his associates.
Local Reporting, Edition Time:
 Lee Hills of the Detroit Free Press for his aggressive, resourceful and comprehensive front page reporting of the United Auto Workers' negotiations with Ford and General Motors for a guaranteed annual wage.
Local Reporting, No Edition Time:
 Arthur Daley of The New York Times, for his outstanding coverage and commentary on the world of sports in his daily column, Sports of the Times.
National Reporting:
 Charles L. Bartlett of the Chattanooga Times, for his original disclosures that led to the resignation of Harold E. Talbott as Secretary of the Air Force.
International Reporting:
 William Randolph Hearst, Jr., J. Kingsbury-Smith, and Frank Conniff of the International News Service, for a series of exclusive interviews with the leaders of the Soviet Union.
Editorial Writing:
Lauren K. Soth of the Des Moines Register and Tribune, for "If the Russians Want More Meat...", inviting a farm delegation from the Soviet Union to visit Iowa, which led directly to the Russian farm visit to the U.S.
Editorial Cartooning:
 Robert York of The Louisville Times, for his cartoon, "Achilles", showing a bulging figure of American prosperity tapering to a weak heel labeled "Farm Prices".
Photography:
 Staff of the New York Daily News, for its consistently excellent news picture coverage in 1955, an outstanding example of which is its photo, "Bomber Crashes in Street".

Letters, Drama and Music Awards

Fiction:
 Andersonville by MacKinlay Kantor (World).
Drama:
 Diary of Anne Frank by Albert Hackett and Frances Goodrich (Random).
History:
 The Age of Reform by Richard Hofstadter (Knopf).
Biography or Autobiography:
 Benjamin Henry Latrobe by Talbot Faulkner Hamlin (Oxford Univ. Press)
Poetry:
 Poems - North & South by Elizabeth Bishop (Houghton).
Music:
 Symphony No. 3 by Ernst Toch (Mills), first performed by the Pittsburgh Symphony Orchestra, December 2, 1955.

References

External links
Pulitzer Prizes for 1956

Pulitzer Prizes by year
Pulitzer Prize
Pulitzer Prize
Pulitzer Prize